Cowan is a city in Franklin County, Tennessee, United States. The population was 1,737 at the 2010 census. It is part of the Tullahoma, Tennessee Micropolitan Statistical Area.

History 

The earliest settlers arrived in the Cowan area in the late 18th and early 19th centuries.  The home of one such settler, William Russell, served as the Franklin County Courthouse until the establishment of Winchester in 1810.  The town was named for Dr. James Benjamin Cowan, a Civil War-era doctor whose family had lived in the area since the early 1800s.

The town of Cowan dates from the mid-19th century and developed mostly as a railroad town. It was the site where several branch lines met the main  Nashville to Chattanooga trunk of the Nashville, Chattanooga and St. Louis Railway which ran through the important Cowan Tunnel. As the last stop before the uphill climb onto the nearby Cumberland Plateau, pusher engines to assist trains in making the steep ascent were based there, and are still in use today.

The town's economy declined with the importance of the railroad after U.S. Route 41A was built in the 1940s. The old passenger depot, built in 1904, was restored as a museum, and is a focal point of the downtown area.

Geography 
Cowan is located at  (35.166668, -86.011839).  The city is situated at the western base of the Cumberland Plateau, and is concentrated around the point where U.S. Route 41A crosses the CSX railroad tracks.  The edge of the Plateau juts out in a series of ridges creating several small valleys in the area, including Hawkins Cove to the northeast and Keith Cove to the south.  Cowan is drained by Boiling Fork Creek, a tributary of the Elk River.

US 41A (Cumberland Street) is the primary road in Cowan, connecting the city with Winchester and the Tims Ford Lake area to the west.

Demographics

2020 census

As of the 2020 United States census, there were 1,759 people, 624 households, and 341 families residing in the city.

2000 census
As of the census of 2000, there were 1,770 people, 746 households, and 499 families residing in the city. The population density was 895.6 people per square mile (345.2/km2). There were 803 housing units at an average density of 406.3 per square mile (156.6/km2). The racial makeup of the city was 87.68% White, 9.44% African American, 0.17% Native American, 0.00% Asian, 0.79% from other races, and 1.92% from two or more races. Hispanic or Latino of any race were 1.36% of the population.

There were 746 households, out of which 30.8% had children under the age of 18 living with them, 46.6% were married couples living together, 16.4% had a female householder with no husband present, and 33.0% were non-families. 31.4% of all households were made up of individuals, and 14.3% had someone living alone who was 65 years of age or older. The average household size was 2.36 and the average family size was 2.95.

In the city, the population was spread out, with 24.7% under the age of 18, 8.5% from 18 to 24, 25.6% from 25 to 44, 22.7% from 45 to 64, and 18.5% who were 65 years of age or older. The median age was 39 years. For every 100 females, there were 86.3 males. For every 100 females age 18 and over, there were 84.2 males.

The median income for a household in the city was $27,448, and the median income for a family was $33,882. Males had a median income of $27,321 versus $20,909 for females. The per capita income for the city was $18,352. About 13.4% of families and 16.7% of the population were below the poverty line, including 22.8% of those under the age of 18 and 11.4% of those 65 and older.

References

External links

 Visit Cowan - Cowan Commercial Club website
 Cowan Railroad Museum
 NC&StL Preservation Society
 City charter

Cities in Tennessee
Cities in Franklin County, Tennessee
Tullahoma, Tennessee micropolitan area
Populated places established in 1808